Junonia stygia, the brown pansy, dark pansy or Aurivillius' brown pansy, is a butterfly in the family Nymphalidae. It is found in Senegal, Guinea-Bissau, Guinea, Sierra Leone, Liberia, Ivory Coast, Ghana, Togo, Nigeria, Cameroon, Gabon, the Republic of the Congo, the Central African Republic, Angola and the Democratic Republic of the Congo. The habitat consists of forests, including disturbed areas and secondary forests.

The larvae feed on Paulowilhelmia sclerochiton, Asystasia, Barleria, Justicia, and Phaulopsis species.

References

stygia
Butterflies of Africa
Butterflies described in 1894